Sean McGorty (born March 8, 1995) is an American runner who specializes in middle-distance and long-distance events. He ran for the United States at the 2014 NACAC Cross Country Championships, where he won the junior men's race. He competed in NCAA Cross Country and Track & Field for Stanford University. Upon graduation, he joined the Bowerman Track Club, which trained in Portland, Oregon until 2022 when the team moved to Eugene, Oregon.

Running career

High school
McGorty attended Chantilly High School in Fairfax, Virginia. Before high school, he tried various sports, but ended up running cross country and track for his high school. In his freshman year of cross country, he recorded 16:26 in a 5K race. At the 2013 Penn Relays, he set the high school boy's mile meet record at 4:04.47.

Collegiate
On January 17, 2015, McGorty made his indoor track debut with Stanford at the University of Washington Indoor Preview, where he ran the mile in 3:59.34, becoming the first collegiate runner to run a sub-four minute mile in 2015. He placed seventh overall at the 2015 NCAA DI Cross Country Championships. On May 1, 2016, he fulfilled the Olympic standard in the men's 5000 meters with a personal record of 13:24.25, clinching a berth at the 2016 US Olympic Trials. At the 2018 NCAA Championships, McGorty won the men's 5,000 meter title with a time of 13:54.81, outkicking heavy favorite Justyn Knight as well as the 2017 champion and Stanford teammate Grant Fisher.

Post-collegiate
On July 14, 2018, McGorty ran his first race in Europe at the Guldensporenmeeting in Kortrijk, Belgium, where he edged out Sammy Kirongo to win the men's 1500 meters with a new personal best time of 3:36.61. On August 3, 2018, McGorty placed seventh overall in the men's mile at the 2018 Sir Walter Miler, running 3:55.21.

McGorty ran a 3000m PR of 7:37.47 on February 6, 2021 in Phoenix, AZ.

At the 2020 US Olympic team trials, McGorty achieved some notoriety when he paused mid-race to put his shoe back on, but nevertheless qualified for the finals.

References

Living people
1995 births
Sportspeople from Fairfax, Virginia
American male middle-distance runners
Stanford Cardinal men's track and field athletes
Pan American Games competitors for the United States
Stanford Cardinal men's cross country runners